Garra tyao is a species of cyprinid fish in the genus Garra endemic to the Tyao River in India.

References 

Garra
Fish described in 2014